Kabwum District is a district of the Morobe Province of Papua New Guinea.  Its capital is Kabwum.  The population of the district was 43,472 at the 2010 census. It is one of the mountainous places in Papua New Guinea. 
It is made up of four local level governments (LLGs) namely Komba, Selepet, Timbe or Deyamos and Yus.
It shares its borders with the following districts of Morobe namely Finchhafen, Nawaeb and Tewai-Siassi. It also shares its border with Raicoast District of Madang Province.
There are no direct road link from Lae City, the Provincial Capital to Kabwum District. So the way to get there from Lae is either by small planes or by ship and speed boat. If you choose to arrive by a plane then it will drop you directly at one of the local air-strips in the district. But if you choose ship or speed boats, then they will drop at Wasu where there is a highway road called Kabwum Highway linked to the mountainous part of the District. From there you can choose one of the local PMV to take you to your destiny. 
  
The main Christian Denomination in there is The Evangelical Lutheran Church of Papua New Guinea. However, there are also other denominations such as Seventh Day Adventist, Revival PNG, Baptist and others which are predominant due to change in faith and believes.

References 

Districts of Papua New Guinea
Morobe Province